Beauvoir-Wavans is a commune in the Pas-de-Calais department in the Hauts-de-France region in northern France. It was formed in 1974 by the merger of the former communes Wavans-sur-l'Authie and Beauvoir-Rivière.

Geography
A village located 33 miles (52 km) southwest of Arras at the junction of the D117 with the D938 road.

Population

Sights
 Two churches dedicated to St. Vaast, from the sixteenth century and the 17th century.
 The Château de Beauvoir-Rivière, built in 1780.
 The World War I cemetery.

See also
Communes of the Pas-de-Calais department

References

External links

 The CWGC cemetery at Wavans

Communes of Pas-de-Calais